HMS Acorn  was a destroyer of the British Royal Navy and the lead ship of her class. She was built by John Brown and Company at their Clydebank shipyard, being built and completed in 1910. The ship served throughout the First World War and was sold for scrap in 1921.

Construction and design
The British Admiralty ordered 20  destroyers as part of the 1909–1910 shipbuilding programme for the Royal Navy. Acorn, the first of the three and the lead ship of the class, was laid down on 12 January 1910 and launched on 1 July 1910. Acorn reached a speed of  during sea trials and was completed in December 1910.

Displacement was  normal and  full load. The ship's machinery consisted of four Yarrow boilers feeding steam to Parsons steam turbines which drove three propeller shafts. The ship had a crew of 72 officers and enlisted.

Gun armament consisted of two  BL Mk VIII guns, one on the ship's forecastle and one aft, and two 12-pounder (76 mm) QF 12 cwt guns carried in the waist position between the first two funnels. Torpedo armament consisted of two  torpedo tubes, with two reload torpedoes carried. The torpedo tubes were aft of the funnels, mounted singly with a searchlight position between them.

Service
On commissioning, Acorn joined the 2nd Destroyer Flotilla of the Royal Navy's Home Fleet, and was joined by her sister ships as they commissioned. She was involved in a collision with her sister ship, on 7 March 1911, and took part in the Coronation Fleet Review on 24 July 1911. Acorn was one of seven destroyers that suffered problems when steaming at full speed off the coast of Ireland during the 1911 Naval Manoeuvres, with serious leaks of water through hull rivets into the ships' oil tanks, requiring that the seven destroyers put into Portland Harbour for repairs.

On the outbreak of the First World War in August 1914, the 2nd Destroyer Flotilla, including Acorn joined the newly established Grand Fleet. Acorn remained part of the 2nd Destroyer Flotilla until November 1915, then transferring to the 5th Destroyer Flotilla, part of the Mediterranean Fleet, arriving at Malta on 31 December. Acorn remained part of the Mediterranean Fleet at the end of the war in November 1918, when she was serving in the Aegean Squadron, based at Mudros.

Disposal
Acorn was in reserve at Devonport Naval Base in March 1919, and was sold for scrap to Marple & Gillot of Saltash on 29 November 1921.

Pennant Numbers

References

 
 
 
 
 
 

 

Acorn-class destroyers
World War I destroyers of the United Kingdom
1910 ships